Mount Forest is an unincorporated community located at the junction of Highway 6 and Highway 89 in the township of Wellington North, Ontario, Canada.  As of the 2011 Canadian census the population of Mount Forest was 4,757 .

History
Prior to European settlement, present day Mount Forest was prime hunting ground for the Saugeen Ojibway peoples due to its location on the Saugeen River. Because of this, many sacred burial sites are believed to be located in the White Bluffs region of present-day Mount Forest.

During the survey of the Garafraxa Colonization Road, constructed from Arthur to Georgian Bay in 1840–48, land was reserved for a settlement. By 1851 a post office was established. The village was originally known as Maitland Hills, because it was believed to be on the Maitland River system. This was incorrect; the village is on a height of land near the headwaters of the South Saugeen River.

The settlement was surveyed into lots in 1853 by Francis Kerr, a provincial land surveyor, with the village-plot named Mount Forest. The village straddled the Garafraxa Road leading to early growth. When the United Counties of Wellington and Grey was dissolved in January 1854, Wellington and Grey were separate counties for all purposes, with the village in Arthur Township, Wellington County for electoral purposes. By 1864, the population had grown to 1185 so that it qualified to be incorporated as a village. In 1869, Mount Forest was listed as an "incorporated Village in the Townships of Egremont, Normanby and Arthur" in the County of Wellington, as being "one of the most enterprising villages in the West" with a population of 1700. The townships of Egremont and Normanby were north of town in adjacent Grey County, while south of the town was Arthur Township.

The 1871 town directory stated that Mount Forest had ten hotels, eight churches and 18 stores. Later that year the Toronto, Grey and Bruce Railway was completed and the first train entered Mount Forest pulled by a wood-burning engine. By 1879, Mount Forest had become an incorporated town.

Mount Forest was amalgamated into the new township of Wellington North on 1 January 1999.

Media
A local newspaper, the Mount Forest Confederate, was first printed in 1867. For the first year, the newspaper was sent to village residents free of charge, then in the second year for 50 cents annually. It ceased publication in August 2019.

Hospital
Dr. A.R. Perry purchased the home of Alex Martin on the corner of Dublin and Princess Streets and established Strathcona Hospital, a 10-bed private hospital. In 1923, a group of citizens headed by G.L. Allen changed Strathcona Hospital into a public hospital. Wentworth Marshall, a pharmacist, generously bought the hospital from Perry. Marshall's mother, Louise, was the supervisor at the hospital until she became ill with cancer. It was closed in 1921, but a year later reopened under a new name: Mount Forest General Hospital. In 1928, the deed of the hospital was turned over to the town and the name was changed yet again to Louise Marshall Hospital in honour of Marshall's mother.

Education
The first public school was built in 1856. The first high school was originally in the Old Drill Hall, but was an unsuitable location because it was beside the Market Square where livestock sales were held monthly.

The new high school was built in 1878. A third high school was founded in 2004, with students from the neighbouring town of Arthur joining those from the Mount Forest district.

Climate
Mount Forest features a humid continental climate, characterised by warm, sometimes wet summers and cold, snowy winters. At an elevation of 430 meters (1,410 ft) above sea level, Mount Forest is one of the highest towns in Southern Ontario being located in the western portion of the Dundalk Highlands. As such, its elevation and location downwind of Lake Huron makes it prone to hefty snow totals from lake effect snow averaging nearly 300 centimetres per year. Summers are often cooler than they otherwise would be due to the town's elevation and overnight lows are considerably cooler than places along the lakeshore.

Culture
Mount Forest's library was completed in 1913 with a grant of $10,000 from well-known philanthropist Andrew Carnegie. Mount Forest is also the site of the founding of the Society of Rural Physicians of Canada.

Mount Forest was the first place that Aimee Semple McPherson preached.

The Mount Forest Chamber of Commerce along with the Arthur and Minto Chambers formed a networking group named Northern Wellington Young Professionals in October 2012.  This is a group of business owners, entrepreneurs, community leaders, and business leaders between 20 and 40 years old who get together for networking events.  It gives local businesses within Northern Wellington Township an opportunity to grow their customer/client base and meet fellow young professionals within the community.  Northern Wellington Young Professionals operates out of Mount Forest but holds events in Harriston and Arthur as well.

Mount Forest also hosts a number of different sporting events throughout the year. The Mount Forest Patriots are a local junior "C" hockey club that were very successful through the mid-1990s. The Trillium 10k is an annual race held each May which features 10 km and 5 km running races, a 5 km walk event, and a 10 km inline speed skating race which has been contested by members of the Canadian national team.

Churches

United Church of Canada

Built in 1873, Mount Forest United Church is an important part of the local history of Mount Forest and continues to be one of the most historic, and recognizable landmarks of the area.. Today, Mount Forest United Church is one of two congregations in Mount Forest-Woodland Pastoral Charge of the United Church of Canada in what is now Western Ontario Waterways Regional Council (Region 8), and was formerly in Hamilton Conference.

Methodism

Methodist circuit riders first began ministering throughout the region in the 1840s, the first being the Reverend John Shilton in 1842. In 1844, Shilton led the construction of the first Methodist place of worship in Mount Forest, on the corner of Highway 6 and Sligo Road. Mount Forest became its own circuit in 1863 with 147 members. In 1852 the Wesleyan Methodist church was built, and in 1874 the two Methodist congregations merged and built a new church on Wellington Street and Elgin Street. Originally costing $16,000, 215 members contributed to the construction of this new building. In 1884, another Methodist community in the area joined this growing congregation. In 1925, the Methodist churches in Canada became one of the founding members of the new United Church of Canada.  All of the buildings in Mount Forest which were at one time associated with these Methodist churches have been demolished.

Presbyterianism

Presbyterianism in Mount Forest can trace its roots to at least the early 1850s.  In 1856 a request was sent to Hamilton Presbytery for a minister as well as permission to erect a church building.  A split occurred shortly thereafter and subsequently two churches were built in town: Knox Presbyterian Church was built near the present-day Presbyterian Church, and Saint Andrew's Presbyterian which was built on the intersection of King Street and Fergus Street. In 1873 and under the guidance of the Reverend John MacMillan, Knox Presbyterian constructed a new church building, what is now known as Mount Forest United Church.  The Grand Master of the Grand Lodge of Canada laid the corner stone and after the reuniting of the Presbyterian communities in Mount Forest, the name was changed to Westminster Presbyterian.  The first organ was installed in 1890, but was replaced in 1910, and again in 1957. In 1925, Westminster Presbyterian joined the United Church of Canada (after a congregational vote of 255 to 32) and the Methodist communities joined them under this one roof.

Roman Catholicism

The first Roman Catholic church was a simple log church constructed in 1858, but burnt to the ground the day before its consecration.  The current Roman Catholic Church, Saint Mary's, was constructed in 1864.  Their first priest was Father P.S. Mahuet, and was consecrated by the Bishop of Hamilton, the Most Reverend Doctor Farrell. The rectory was built in 1880 and was converted into a convent housing the Sisters of Saint Joseph, though it was demolished in 2002 to create enough space for their new parish facilities.

Transportation

Mount Forest sits at the junction of Ontario Highway 6 (north−south) and Ontario Highway 89 (east−west). It is served by Kasper Transportation's Owen Sound to Guelph intercity bus route, which began operating in January 2020 with a fourteen-seat passenger van. There are two buses in each direction on Monday to Saturday, one in the morning and one in the afternoon.

Notable people
Patrick McKenna, comedy and dramatic actor
Norman Platt Lambert, Canadian Senator (1938-1965), General Secretary, President and Chief Organizer of the National Liberal Federation (1932-1938)
Frederick William Campbell - Mount Forest born recipient of the Victoria Cross for actions in France during the First World War
Dinah Christie - actress and singer

References

External links

Mount Forest

Communities in Wellington County, Ontario
Former towns in Ontario
Populated places disestablished in 1999